China Institute in America is a nonprofit educational and cultural institution in New York City. It teaches an American audience about Chinese culture and history through talks, business initiatives, language immersion programs and gallery exhibits.
 
China Institute was founded in 1926 by a group of American and Chinese educators—including educational philosopher John Dewey of Columbia University and Chinese educator Hu Shih (later president of Peking University and China's ambassador to the U.S.) and a gallery was added in 1966. The institute is believed to be the oldest educational organization devoted solely to Chinese culture, and has drawn one million visitors in its nearly hundred years of existence. Following the 1949 establishment of the People's Republic of China, the organization lost many of its ties to the Chinese mainland. In 2015, China Institute announced plans to move from the Upper East Side to Lower Manhattan the following year. The new space at 100 Washington Street opened in November 2016 in tandem with the gallery's fiftieth anniversary.

References

External links

Language education
Chinese culture
Chinese language
1926 establishments in New York City
Non-profit organizations based in New York City
Museums in Manhattan
Art museums and galleries in New York City
1920s establishments in New York City
Lower Manhattan